Flowers on the Wall is the debut studio album by the Statler Brothers. It produced their debut single "Flowers on the Wall", a Top 5 country and pop hit that year. Members of Johnny Cash's band, the Tennessee Three played on the album, as it was recorded in between takes during the recording of a Johnny Cash album.

Track listing
"Flowers on the Wall" (Lew DeWitt) - 2:19
"My Darling Hildegarde" (Don Reid) - 1:40
"King of the Road" (Roger Miller) - 2:06
"Memphis, Tennessee" (Chuck Berry) - 1:56
"I'm Not Quite Through Crying" (DeWitt) - 2:21
"My Reward" (Austin Roberts) - 2:46
"This Ole House" (Stuart Hamblen) - 1:44
"Billy Christian" (Tom T. Hall) - 2:01
"The Doodlin' Song" (Harold Reid) - 2:08
"Quite a Long, Long Time" (DeWitt) - 2:23
"Whiffenpoof Song" (Tod Galloway, Meade Minnigerode) - 1:48
"I Still Miss Someone" (Johnny Cash, Roy Cash) - 2:28

References

1966 debut albums
Columbia Records albums
The Statler Brothers albums